Francis Patrick Sheehan (31 August 1884 – 29 April 1953) was an American athlete. He competed in the 1908 Summer Olympics in London. In the 800 meters, Sheehan placed last in his initial semifinal heat and did not advance to the final.

References

Sources
 
 
 

1884 births
1953 deaths
Athletes (track and field) at the 1908 Summer Olympics
Olympic track and field athletes of the United States
American male middle-distance runners